Pecqueuse is a commune in the Essonne department in the southern suburbs of Paris, France. It lies adjacent to the west of the larger town Limours. Inhabitants of Pecqueuse are known as Pescusiens in French.

Places to see
 A church built in the 18th century.

See also
Communes of the Essonne department

References

External links

  Official web site 
Mayors of Essonne Association 

Communes of Essonne